The women's 60 metres hurdles event  at the 1999 IAAF World Indoor Championships was held on March 5.

Medalists

Results

Heats
First 2 of each heat (Q) and next 12 fastest (q) qualified for the semifinals.

Final

References
Results

Hurdles
60 metres hurdles at the World Athletics Indoor Championships
1999 in women's athletics